George Barnard may refer to:

George Alfred Barnard (1915–2002), British statistician
George G. Barnard (1829–1879), New York judge
George Grey Barnard (1863–1938), American sculptor
George Henry Barnard (1868–1954), Canadian politician
George N. Barnard (1819–1902), American Civil War photographer
George William Barnard (1873–1941), Australian politician
George Barnard (zoologist) (1831–1894), British ornithologist and entomologist
George Barnard (cricketer) (1804–1827), English cricketer

See also
George Barnard Baker (1834–1910), Canadian lawyer and political figure